Ernst Enno ( in Valguta – 7 March 1934 in Haapsalu) was an Estonian poet and writer.

Life 
Ernst Enno was born in Köödsa inn as the son of Valguta Manor's coachman Prits Enno. He spent his childhood on Soosaar farm in Valguta near Rõngu. At the age of eight, he attended the parish school of Lapetukme and then the prestigious Hugo Treffner Gymnasium and at the secondary school (Reaalkool) in Tartu. Enno studied business administration from 1896 to 1904 at the Riga Polytechnic Institute.
During his Riga period he worked as a journalist. After studying Enno was briefly a general counsel at the credit union in Valga and in a trading company in Pärnu. 1902 to 1904 he was editor of the newspaper Postimees in Tartu and from 1923 to 1925 editor of the Estonian children's magazine Laste Rõõm, and on other magazines. In addition, he was employed from 1920 to 1934 as a training officer in Lääne County.
In 1909, Enno married the artist Elfriede Olga Saul (died 1974 in exile in England).

Work 
The work of Ernst Enno is influenced by Buddhism and Western mysticism. Enno was in addition strongly bound to symbolism. The childhood spent in the countryside, the stories of his devout mother Ann Enno and his blind grandmother had a formative influence on his literary work. The home, the road and longing are recurring elements in his poetry.

Published works 
Uued luuletused (collection of poems, 1909)
Hallid laulud (collection of poems, 1910)
Minu sõbrad (1910)
Kadunud kodu (1920)
Valge öö (collection of poems, 1920)
Valitud värsid (anthology, 1937)
Üks rohutirts läks kõndima (Children's book, 1957), compiled by Ellen Niit
Väike luuleraamat (poetry, 1964)
Rändaja õhtulaul (1998), compiled by Urmas Tõnisson
Laps ja tuul (2000)

References

External links
 Ernst Enno at Estonian Writers' Online Dictionary

1875 births
1934 deaths
People from Elva Parish
People from Kreis Dorpat
Estonian male poets
20th-century Estonian poets
Hugo Treffner Gymnasium alumni
Riga Technical University alumni